Mount Kohler is a mountain,  high, on the south side of Boyd Glacier located  east of Mount Woodward in the Ford Ranges of Marie Byrd Land, Antarctica. It was mapped by a 1939–41 United States Antarctic Service expedition led by Richard Evelyn Byrd, and was named for Herbert V. Kohler, Jr. and Ruth DeYoung Kohler II, son and daughter of Herbert V. Kohler, a financial contributor to the Byrd Antarctic Expedition, 1933–35.

References

Mountains of Marie Byrd Land